Tristan Clovis (born August 25, 1982) is a former a Canadian football safety. He played CIS Football at McMaster before being drafted by the Canadian Football League, playing for the Saskatchewan Roughriders for three seasons including their Grey Cup-winning 2007 season.

He is the younger brother of Sebastian Clovis, a former BC Lions player and television personality.

References

1982 births
Canadian football defensive backs
Living people
McMaster Marauders football players
Players of Canadian football from Ontario
Saskatchewan Roughriders players
Canadian football people from Toronto
Black Canadian players of Canadian football